Argyrotaenia graviduncus is a species of moth of the family Tortricidae. It is found in Peru.

The wingspan is about 18 mm. The ground colour of the forewings is cream, suffused and strigulated (finely streaked) with brownish and with pale brown markings. The hindwings are whitish cream, but darker terminally.

Etymology
The species name refers to the size of the uncus and is derived from Latin gravidus (meaning burdened).

References

Moths described in 2010
graviduncus
Moths of South America